Mathias Wehrli (born 9 October 1962) is a Swiss former footballer who played in the 1980s as defender.

Wehrli first played for FC Laufen in the Nationalliga B, the second tier of Swiss football. At the end of the season 1985–86 Wehrli and the team suffered relegation but he stayed with the club for another season.

Wehrli joined FC Basel's first team in their 1987–88 season under head-coach Urs Siegenthaler. After playing in five test games, Wehrli played his domestic league debut for his new club in the away game on 8 August 1987 as Basel were defeated 0–2 by Aarau.

Wehrli stayed with the club only this one season and during this time he played a total of seven games for Basel without scoring a goal. Two of these games were in the Nationalliga A and the other five were friendly games.

References

Sources
 Die ersten 125 Jahre. Publisher: Josef Zindel im Friedrich Reinhardt Verlag, Basel. 
 Verein "Basler Fussballarchiv" Homepage

FC Laufen players
FC Basel players
Swiss men's footballers
Association football defenders
1962 births
Living people